Henrietta Street may refer to:

Henrietta Street, Bath, a street in the Bathwick area of Bath, Somerset, England
Henrietta Street, Covent Garden, a street in Covent Garden, London
Henrietta Street, Dublin, a street in Dublin, Ireland
Henrietta Street, former name of Henrietta Place, a street in Marylebone, London